Valentin Reitstetter (born 18 January 1998) is a German footballer who plays as a defender for TSV Großbardorf.

References

External links
 Profile at FuPa.net
 

1998 births
Living people
German footballers
Association football defenders
FC Carl Zeiss Jena players
3. Liga players
People from Schweinfurt
Sportspeople from Lower Franconia
Footballers from Bavaria
21st-century German people